Edward Willoughby (died 23 November 1508) was Dean of Exeter between 1496 and 1508.

Career

He was appointed:
Prebendary of Liddington under Shaftesbury
Prebendary of North Grantham at Salisbury 1488
Dean of Exeter 1496 - 1508
Archdeacon of Stafford

He was appointed to the twelfth stall in St George's Chapel, Windsor Castle in 1495, and held the stall until 1508.

Notes

1508 deaths
Deans of Exeter
Canons of Windsor
Year of birth missing